Sunset Grill may refer to:

"Sunset Grill" (song), a song by Don Henley, first released on his 1984 album Building the Perfect Beast
Sunset Grill (film), a 1993 film starring Peter Weller, Lori Singer, and Stacy Keach
Sunset Grill (restaurant), a restaurant in West Hollywood, California
Sunset Grill (Canadian restaurant chain), a restaurant chain throughout the province of Ontario

See also
 Sunset Bar and Grill
 Sunset (disambiguation)